The following Union Army units and commanders fought in the Knoxville Campaign and subsequent East Tennessee operations during the American Civil War from November 4 to December 23, 1863 under the command of Maj. Gen. Ambrose E. Burnside. Engagements fought during this time included the battles of Campbell's Station and Fort Sanders and the siege of Knoxville. Order of battle compiled from the army organization during the campaign and return of casualties. The Confederate order of battle is shown separately.

Abbreviations used

Military rank
 MG = Major General
 BG = Brigadier General
 Col = Colonel
 Ltc = Lieutenant Colonel
 Maj = Major
 Cpt = Captain
 Lt = 1st Lieutenant

Other
 mw = mortally wounded
 k = killed

Army of the Ohio

MG Ambrose E. Burnside (March 25–December 11, 1863)MG John G. Foster (December 11, 1863 – February 9, 1864)

General Headquarters (Staff: 14 officers)
 Chief of Staff: MG John G. Parke
 Escort: 6th Indiana Cavalry: Col James Biddle

IX Corps

BG Robert B. Potter

XXIII Corps

BG Mahlon D. Manson (September 24–December 20, 1863)Jacob Dolson Cox (December 21, 1863 – February 8, 1864)

General Headquarters (Staff and escort: 14 officers, 95 men)
 Chief of Engineers: Col Orlando M. Poe
 McLaughlin's Ohio Cavalry Squadron: Maj Richard Rice

Cavalry Corps

BG James M. ShackelfordBG Samuel D. Sturgis (December 12, 1863 – April 15, 1864)

Left Wing Forces
BG Orlando B. Willcox

Notes

Footnotes

Citations

References

American Civil War orders of battle